St Athan Road is the main road used to travel between Cowbridge and St Athan or further on to Barry by using the B4265 road. It begins east of Eglwys Brewis and north of East Camp where Cowbridge Road ends. It travels just past St Mary Church and directly through The Herberts, where it crosses the A48 and continues on past Llandough before finally reaching Cowbridge.

The only other road to St Athan is the B4265 road.

History

On 1 December 2013 a driver was killed in a car crash which closed the road for three hours. The car "left the carriageway" after travelling from St Athan towards Cowbridge.

References

Villages in the Vale of Glamorgan
St Athan
Roads in the Vale of Glamorgan